"You Do Your Thing" is a song recorded by American country music duo Montgomery Gentry.  It was released in July 2004 as the second single and title track from the album of the same name.  The song reached #22 on the Billboard Hot Country Singles & Tracks chart.  The song was written by Ed Hill and Casey Beathard.

Chart performance

References

Montgomery Gentry songs
2004 singles
Music videos directed by Michael Salomon
2004 songs
Songs written by Casey Beathard
Songs written by Ed Hill
Columbia Records singles